The 1899 Michigan Wolverines baseball team represented the University of Michigan in the 1899 college baseball season.  The Wolverines were led by head coach Henry Clarke.  They won the Western Conference for the first time with a record of 5–2, 14–5 overall.

Personnel

Roster

Staff

Schedule and results

References

Michigan
Michigan Wolverines baseball seasons
Michigan Wolverines baseball
Big Ten Conference baseball champion seasons